This is a list of the albums ranked number one in the United States during 2023. The top-performing albums and EPs in the U.S. are ranked on the Billboard 200 chart, which is published by Billboard magazine. The data is compiled by Luminate Data based on multi-metric consumption as measured in album-equivalent units, which comprise album sales, track sales, and streams on digital music platforms. Each unit equals one album sold, or 10 individual digital tracks sold from an album, or 3,750 ad-supported or 1,250 paid/subscription on-demand official audio and video streams generated by songs from an album.

SOS (2022), the second studio album by American R&B singer SZA, is the year's longest reigning number-one on the Billboard 200 so far, topping the chart for eight weeks in 2023. Mañana Será Bonito, the fourth studio album by Colombian urbano singer Karol G, became the first ever Spanish-language album by a female artist to reach the number one spot, and only the third Spanish-language album to top the chart in its 78-year history.

One Thing at a Time, the third studio album of American country singer Morgan Wallen, garnered the largest opening week of 2023, with 501,000 units—the largest since Taylor Swift's Midnights (2022) moved 1.58 million units.

Chart history

See also 
 List of Billboard Hot 100 number ones of 2023
 List of Billboard Global 200 number ones of 2023
 2023 in American music

References

United States Albums
2023